Susan Cheesebrough (born 9 September 1959) is a British gymnast. She competed at the 1976 Summer Olympics and the 1980 Summer Olympics. Her father, Albert, was a professional footballer.

References

1959 births
Living people
British female artistic gymnasts
Olympic gymnasts of Great Britain
Gymnasts at the 1976 Summer Olympics
Gymnasts at the 1980 Summer Olympics
Sportspeople from Leicester
Commonwealth Games silver medallists for England
Commonwealth Games medallists in gymnastics
Gymnasts at the 1978 Commonwealth Games
Gladiators (1992 British TV series)
Medallists at the 1978 Commonwealth Games